Theodosius of Alexandria may refer to:
Theodosius of Alexandria (grammarian) (c. 3rd century CE), author of a work on inflection of Greek nouns and verbs
Patriarch Theodosius I of Alexandria (died 567)
Pope Theodosius II of Alexandria (fl. 730–742)
Patriarch Theodosius II of Alexandria (fl. 12th century)
Pope Theodosius III of Alexandria (fl. 1293–1300)